HMS Wanderer was a Cormorant-class ship-sloop launched in 1806 for the Royal Navy. The Royal Navy sold her in 1817. She made one voyage between 1817 and 1820 as a whaler in the British southern whale fishery. She then sailed between Plymouth and North America until October 1827 when her crew had to abandon her at sea because she was waterlogged.

Royal Navy career
Wanderer was commissioned in December 1806 under Commander Edward Crofton. She was designated for the North Sea Station in 1807.

All three arrived on 6 September, the day of the formal acceptance by both sides of the articles of capitulation. Then on 24 October Wanderer recaptured Nancy.

The small squadron attempted an attack on St. Martin with a view to reducing the number of havens available to French privateers, but unfortunately the opposition proved stronger than intelligence had suggested.

The attack was a debacle. A landing party of 38 seamen and marines from all three vessels, under Lieutenant George A. Spearing, captain of Subtle, succeeded in capturing a lower battery with few losses and spiking six guns. An attack on the upper fort failed, with Spearing being killed a few feet from the French ramparts. When the British withdrew to their boats the French captured them. In all, the British lost seven killed and 30 wounded, all the dead and most of the wounded being from Subtle. The French lost one man wounded.

Not surprisingly, French and British accounts differ substantially in several places. Crofton's account reports that the British landing party consisted of 153 men, and a French account talks of 200 men, all of whom were killed or captured, including Lieutenant George Mills, captain of Ballahoo. (The total establishment of the three British vessels amounted to about 190 men.) Crofton negotiated a truce under which he was able to reclaim all the prisoners who could be moved. Crofton claimed that the French had been forewarned and had 900 men in the fort. The French claimed the fort had a garrison of 28 regulars and 15 militia men. That the French permitted their British prisoners to leave is more consistent with the French figures on their numbers than the British. Crofton reported that the French buried the English dead with full military honors with both the fort and the British firing salutes.

Prize money was forwarded in 1815 from the Vice admiralty court in Antigua.

In 1810 Wanderer was under the command of Commander William Robillard, in the Caribbean.

Wanderer also participated in the capture of Guadeloupe in January and February 1810. In 1847 the Admiralty awarded the Naval General Service Medal with clasp "Guadaloupe" to all surviving participants of the campaign.

In 1811 the Navy reclassed her as sixth-rate post-ship. Captain Francis Newcombe took command in April 1811. Wanderer sailed with the Lisbon convoy on 17 June 1812, and then sailed for North America on 28 August. In December she captured the American brig Rising Hope, which had been sailing from Charleston to Cadiz. On 19 January 1813 Wanderer captured Three Friends.

(The Americans later recaptured Adeline.)

HMS Achates and Wanderer hove into sight and went after the privateer.

In October 1814 Wanderer was under the command of Captain John Palmer. Then in December Captain William Dowers sailed her in the Channel.

Disposal: The "Principal Officers and Commissioners of His Majesty's Navy" offered "Wanderer sloop, of 431 tons", lying at Plymouth, for sale on 18 September 1816. The Navy had difficulty selling Wanderer and listed her several times. The Navy finally succeeded in selling her on 6 March 1817 to a Mr. Splidt for £1,150.

Post script: In January 1819, the London Gazette reported that Parliament had voted a grant to all those who had served under the command of Lord Viscount Keith between 1813 and 1814. Wanderer was listed among the vessels that had served under Keith in 1813 and 1814.

Mercantile career
Wanderer entered Lloyd's Register (LR) in 1818 with J. Dunn, master, W. Hodge, owner, and trade Plymouth-South Seas.

Whaler
Captain W. Dunn sailed from Plymouth on 27 August 1817 for the Pacific Ocean. Wanderer was reported to have been at Lima on 1 May 1818, and later was reported to be sailing near California with 1700 barrels of whale oil. Wanderer returned to Britain on 6 November 1820.

Merchantman
In 1821 W. Waygood replaced Dunn as master of Wanderer, and her trade changed to Plymouth-Quebec.

Loss
As Captain Waygood and Wanderer were returning to Plymouth, Devon, from Quebec City, her crew was forced on 26 October 1827 to abandon her. Wanderer was last listed in LR for 1827.

Notes

Citations

References
 
 

1806 ships
Sloops of the Royal Navy
Post ships of the Royal Navy
Age of Sail merchant ships
Merchant ships of the United Kingdom
Whaling ships
Maritime incidents in October 1827